Podkamień  is a village in the administrative district of Gmina Nysa, within Nysa County, Opole Voivodeship, in south-western Poland.

The village has an approximate population of 100.

Notable people
Rudolf Günsberg, chemist

References

Villages in Nysa County